Hazmat, HazMat or HAZMAT may refer to:
 Dangerous goods, hazardous materials and items
 Hazmat suit
 Hazmat diving
 Hazmat (comics) is a Marvel Comics character
 HazMat (film), a 2013 horror film

See also
 Hazmat Modine, a blues/indie folk/world fusion musical group from Dubai